Henry Horton Miller (January 10, 1861 – September 4, 1916) was a Canadian politician.

Life
Born in Owen Sound, Canada West, Miller was educated at the public and high schools of Owen Sound. A real estate agent by occupation, Miller was elected to the House of Commons of Canada for the Ontario electoral district of Grey South in the 1904 federal election. A Liberal, he was re-elected in the 1908 election but was defeated in the 1911 election.

References
 The Canadian Parliament; biographical sketches and photo-engravures of the senators and members of the House of Commons of Canada. Being the tenth Parliament, elected November 3, 1904

1861 births
1916 deaths
Liberal Party of Canada MPs
Members of the House of Commons of Canada from Ontario